Itapalluni (Aymara itapallu nettle, -ni a suffix to indicate ownership, "the one with a nettle") is a mountain located in the Bolivian Andes, about  high. It is situated in the La Paz Department, Loayza Province, Malla Municipality, south-west of Wallatani Lake and the mountain Ch'uxña Quta of the Kimsa Cruz mountain range.

See also
List of mountains in the Andes

References 

Mountains of La Paz Department (Bolivia)